The Hungarian Golden Ball is awarded in Hungary by a vote by Hungarian sport journalists. Eligible are Hungarian players in the Hungary and abroad.

The other football award in Hungary is the Hungarian Footballer of the Year awarded by the Hungarian Football Federation (MLSZ).

History

The Hungarian Golden Ball was founded in 1998 by Imre Mátyás, the founder and editor of online news portal .

Winners

See also

 Hungarian Footballer of the Year

References

Annual events in Hungary
Association football player non-biographical articles
Association football player of the year awards by nationality
Footballers in Hungary
Hungarian awards
Football in Hungary